This is a list of women writers who were born in India or whose writings are closely associated with that nation.

A
Varsha Adalja (born 1940), Gujarati novelist, playwright
Smita Agarwal (born 1958), poet, educator
Vinita Agrawal (born 1965), poet, editor
Meena Alexander (1951–2018), poet, memoirist, essayist, novelist, critic, educator
Samina Ali, contemporary Indian-American novelist, feminist, author of Madras on Rainy Days
Balamani Amma (1909–2004), poet, published many collections of poetry in Malayalam
K. Saraswathi Amma (1919–1975), short story writer, novelist, feminist
Lalithambika Antharjanam (1909–1987), Malayalam short story writer, poet, children's writer, novelist, author of Agnisakshi
Temsula Ao (born 1945), short story writer, poet, educator
Ashitha, since c.1986: Malayalam short story writer, poet

B
Jasodhara Bagchi (1937–2015), leading feminist critic, essayist, activist
Sushmita Banerjee (c.1963–2013), memoirist
Rashmi Bansal (born 1985), non-fiction best-seller writer on entrepreneurship
Bani Basu (born 1939), Bengali novelist, essayist, critic, poet
Barkha Dutt (born 1971), TV journalist
Malati Bedekar (1905–2001), Marathi feminist writer, short story writer, screenwriter
Sheila Bhatia (1916–2008), poet, playwright, theatre director
Sujata Bhatt (born 1956), Gujarati poet, also writing in English
Rajlukshmee Debee Bhattacharya, since the 1990s: poet in Bengali and English
 Anuradha Bhattacharyya (born 1975), poet and novelist in English
Suchitra Bhattacharya (1950–2015), Bengali novelist, short story writer
Nirmal Prabha Bordoloi (1933–2003), Assamese poet, lyricist, children's writer
Urvashi Butalia (born 1952), feminist, publisher, non-fiction writer

C
Neelam Saxena Chandra (born 1969), poet, children's writer, novelist
Chandramathi (born 1954), novelist writing in Malayalam and English
Rimi B. Chatterjee (born 1969), novelist, short story writer, non-fiction writer, translator
Jayasri Chattopadhyay (born 1945), Sanskrit poet, educator
Anuja Chauhan (born 1970), advertiser, novelist, author of The Zoya Factor
Subhadra Kumari Chauhan (1904–1948), Hindi poet
Prem Chowdhry (born 1944), social scientist, feminist, non-fiction writer, essayist
Rita Chowdhury (born 1960), poet, novelist, educator
Raghavan Chudamani (1931–2010), novelist, short story writer, writing in Tamil and English
Ismat Chughtai (1915–1991), Urdu novelist, screenwriter
Ajit Cour (born 1934), Punjabi novelist, short story writer
C. S. Chandrika (born 1967), novelist, short story writer, essayist in Malayalam

D
Esha Dadawala (born 1985), Gujarati poet, journalist
Sukanya Datta (born 1961), scientist and science fiction writer
Abha Dawesar (born 1974), novelist, short story writer, author of Babyji
Shobha De (born 1947), journalist, novelist
Eunice de Souza (born 1940–2017), English-language poet, critic, novelist
Pitambari Debi (1904–?), writer of Odia literature
Anita Desai (born 1937), novelist, author of In Custody
Kamal Desai (1928–c.2011), novelist, writing in Marathi
Kiran Desai (born 1971), novelist, author of The Inheritance of Loss
Dhanashree Deshpande-Ganatra (born 1970), poet, singer, and music producer
Gauri Deshpande (1942–2003), novelist, short story writer, poet, wrote in Marathi and English
Shashi Deshpande (born 1938), novelist, short story writer, children's writer
Sunita Deshpande (1926–2009), Marathi memoirist, letter writer
Nabaneeta Dev Sen (1938–2019), poet, novelist, educator
Ashapoorna Devi (1909–1995), Bengali novelist, poet
Leela Devi (1932–1998), novelist, non-fiction writer, playwright, translator, writing in Malayalam and English
Mahasweta Devi (1926–2016), Bengali-Indian journalist, novelist
Maitreyi Devi (1914–1989), Bengali poet, novelist
M. K. Binodini Devi (1922–2011), Manipuri memoirist, essayist, short story writer, novelist
Nalini Bala Devi (1898–1977), Assamese poet
Nirupama Devi (1883–1951), novelist
Sneha Devi (1916–1990), writer of Assamese literature
Chitra Banerjee Divakaruni (born 1956), Indian-American poet, novelist, short story writer, author of The Mistress of SpicesVarsha Dixit, novelist 
Nirupama Dutt (born 1955), Punjabi poet, journalist, translator
Toru Dutt (1856–1877), poet, novelist, writing in English and French

G
Gangadevi (14th century), Telugu princess, poet, author of Madura VijayamMridula Garg (born 1938), novelist, short story writer, playwright, essayist, writing in Hindi and English
Sagarika Ghose (born 1964), journalist, TV presenter, novelist
Namita Gokhale (born 1956), English-language novelist, short story writer
Padma Gole (1913–1998), Marathi poet
Ellen Lakshmi Goreh (1853–1937), poet, Christian missionary, deaconess and nurse
Nirmala Govindarajan, English-language novelist, journalist
Mamoni Raisom Goswami (1942–2011), Assamese poet, novelist, short story writer, editor, educator
Santhini Govindan (born 1959), children's writer
Kodagina Gowramma, pen name of B. T. Gopal Krishna (1912–1939), short story writer, feminist
Teji Grover (born 1955), poet, novelist, translator, painter
Neelum Saran Gour (born 1955), writer, academic
Ganga Bharani Vasudevan (born 1990), novelist, script writer

H
Baby Halder (born 1973), domestic servant, autobiographer
Githa Hariharan (born 1954), novelist
Chandrakala A. Hate (1903–1990), feminist writer, educator
Nistula Hebbar (born 1975), journalist, columnist, novelist
Vera Hingorani (1924–2018), gynaecologist, medical writer
Saliha Abid Hussain, 20th-century Urdu-language novelist, children's writer
Krishna Hutheesing (1907–1967), biographer, non-fiction writer

I
M. K. Indira (1917–1994), Kannada novelist

J
Manorama Jafa (born 1932), prolific children's writer
Rashid Jahan (1905–1952), Urdi short story writer, playwright
Jana Begum (17th century), early female writer of a commentary on the Qur'an
Pupul Jayakar (1915–1997), biographer, non-fiction writer on handicrafts
Ruth Prawer Jhabvala (1927–2013), acclaimed German-born British novelist, short story writer, screenwriter, grew up in India
Sarah Joseph (born 1946), Malayalam novelist, short story writer, author of Aalahayude PenmakkalIsha Basant Joshi (born 1908, date of death unknown), poet, short story writer
Anees Jung (born 1944), journalist, columnist, non-fiction writer
Kirthi Jayakumar (born 1987), author, non-fiction writer, women's rights activist, feminist
Jyoti Arora (born 1977) Blogger, novelist

K
Neha Kakkar (born 1988), singer
Madhur Kapila (1942–2021), writer, journalist, art critic
Meena Kandasamy (born 1984), poet, biographer, novelist, feminist
Amita Kanekar (born 1965), novelist, educator
Kanhopatra (15th century), Marathi saint-poet
Kota Neelima, writer, journalist, artist 
Lakshmi Kannan (born 1947), Tamil poet and novelist, translates her works into English
Bhanu Kapil (born 1968), British-Indian novelist
Manju Kapur, since 1998: novelist
Swati Kaushal, since 2005: young adult novelist
Girijabai Kelkar (1886–1890), Marathi-language playwright, feminist writer
Sumana Kittur (active since 2007), journalist, film director, lyricist
Habba Khatoon (1554–1609), Kashmiri mystic poet
Mridula Koshy (born 1969), short story writer, novelist
Sumati Kshetramade (1913–1997), novelist
Rajam Krishnan (1925–2014), Tamil novelist, playwright, short story writer, feminist
Priya Kumar (born 1974), novelist
Twinkle Khanna (born 1973), author, columnist

L
Jhumpa Lahiri (born 1967), British-born American-Indian short story writer, novelist, author of The LowlandLalleshwari (1320–1392), Kashmiri mystic poet
Bem Le Hunte (born 1964), British-Indian novelist, now in Australia
Lalitha Lenin (born 1946), acclaimed Malayalam poet, educator
 Ritu Lalit (born 1964), Indian novelist
Monica Lakhmana-Indian history writer, author of ‘Women in Pre and Post Independent India 75 Victories Visionaries Voices.’

M
Akka Mahadevi (12th century), poet writing in Old Kannada
Megha Majumdar, novelist, A BurningTilottama Majumdar (born 1966), Bengali novelist, short story writer, poet, essayist
Anju Makhija, since 1990, poet, playwright, translator
Amita Malik (1921–2009), film and television critic, radio journalist
Kiran Manral (born 1971), novelist, blogger, non-fiction writer
Kamala Markandaya, pen name of Kamala Purnaiya Taylor (1924–2004), best selling novelist, journalist
C K Meena (born 1957), novelist, journalist, educator
Meera (15th century), Hindu mystic poet
K. R. Meera (born 1970), journalist, novelist, short story writer, children's writer
Rama Mehta (1923–1978), sociologist, novelist, non-fiction writer
Indu Menon (born 1980), Malayalam novelist, short story writer, screenwriter, sociologist
Jaishree Misra (born 1961), best-selling novelist
Baisali Mohanty (born 1994), author, columnist, non-fiction writer
Molla (1440–1530), poet, translated the Ramayana into Telugu
Muddupalani (18th century), Telugu poet
Chitra Mudgal (born 1944), Hindi novelist
Bharati Mukherjee (1940–2017), Indian-American novelist, short story writer, non-fiction writer, author of JasmineKhadija Mumtaz (born 1955), medical doctor, novelist, author of Barsa (novel)Sudha Murthy (born 1950), Kannada novelist, short story writer, children's writer, sociologist, businesswomen
Seema Mustafa, since 1990s, journalist, biographer, newspaper editor
Meher Pestonji, (born 1946), freelance journalist, author

N
Sarojini Naidu (1879–1949), child prodigy, Indian independence activist, poet
Anita Nair (born 1966), English-language poet, novelist, author of Ladies CoupéNalini Priyadarshni (born 1974), poet, writer, critic
Suniti Namjoshi (born 1941), poet, short story writer, children's writer
Meera Nanda (born 1954), Indian-American historian, religious writer
Anupama Niranjana (1934–1991), medical doctor, Kannada novelist, short story writer

P
Manjula Padmanabhan (born 1953), playwright, journalist, comic strip artist, children's writer
Mrinal Pande (born 1946), television presenter, journalist, novelist, non-fiction writer, newspaper editor
Meghna Pant (born 1980), award-winning novelist, non-fiction writer, journalist, feminist, columnist, speaker
Dhiruben Patel (born 1926), Gujarati novelist, short story writer, playwright, translator
Savitribai Phule (1831–1897), poet, social reformer
Gita Piramal (born c. 1954), magazine editor, businesswoman, non-fiction writer
Gudibande Poornima (born 1951), poet, novelist, non-fiction writer
Manjiri Prabhu (born 1964), novelist, filmmaker
Manasi Pradhan (born 1962), novelist, women's rights activist
Amrita Pritam (1919–2005), poet, novelist, essayist, first prominent Punjabi woman poet
Neelkamal Puri (born 1956), Punjabi novelist, short story writer, columnist, educator
Deanne Pandey (born 1968), fitness and lifestyle writer

R
Rajalakshmi (1930–1965), Malayalam poet, novelist
Rajashree, author of the chick lit best seller Trust Me (2006)
Anuradha Ramanan (1947–2010), prolific novelist, short story writer
Ramanichandran, contemporary best selling Tamil novelist
Ravinder Randhawa (born 1952), British-Indian novelist, short story writer
Bhargavi Rao (1944–2008), specialist in Telugu literature, translator, anthologist
Malathi Rao (born 1930), novelist, short story writer
Usha Rao-Monari (born 1959), economist and non-fiction writer
Santha Rama Rau (1923–2009), Indian-American novelist, playwright
Nuchhungi Renthlei (1914–2002), poet, singer, school teacher, women's rights activist 
Anusree Roy (born 1982), Indo-Canadian playwright, actress
Anuradha Roy (born 1967), novelist
Arundhati Roy (born 1961), novelist, author of The God of Small ThingsNilanjana S. Roy (born c. 1971), journalist, children's writer
Kamini Roy (1864–1933), leading Bengali poet, essayist, feminist
Sumana Roy, Indian poet, novelist, short story writer
Rita Kothari, Author, Professor, Translation Studies and Partition http://www.iitgn.ac.in/faculty/humanities/rita.htm

S
Padma Sachdev (1940–2021), Dogri poet, novelist, also writing in Hindi
Nayantara Sahgal (born 1927), novelist, memoirist, letter writer, author of Rich Like UsSarojini Sahoo (born 1956), feminist writer, novelist, short-story writer, author of Sensible SensualityNandini Sahu (born 1973), English-language poet, folklorist, academic
Indira Sant (1914–2000), Marathi poet
Krupabai Satthianadhan (1862–1894), early English-language Indian novelist
Mala Sen (1947–2011), writer and human rights activist, author of India's Bandit Queen''
Mallika Sengupta (1960–2011), Bengali poet, novelist, feminist, sociologist
Poile Sengupta (born 1948), English-language playwright, children's writer, poet
Teesta Setalvad (born 1962), journalist, civil rights activist
Madhuri R. Shah (fl. 1970-80s), educationist, non-fiction writer
Shantichitra (born 1978), novelist, short story writer, educator
Sarjana Sharma (born 1959), journalist, broadcaster
Shanta Shelke (1922–2002), Marathi poet, novelist, short story writer, educator
Preeti Shenoy (born 1971), novelist, non-fiction writer
Melanie Silgardo (born 1956), poet
Sunny Singh (born 1969), journalist, novelist, short story writer
Sunny Singh (1931–1999), Bengali poet, novelist, feminist
Kabita Sinha (1931–1999), Bengali poet, novelist, feminist
Mridula Sinha (1942–2020), state governor of Goa, Hindi novelist, short story writer
Shumona Sinha (born 1973), Indian born French writer, novelist, feminist
Sivasankari (born 1942), Tamil novelist
Krishna Sobti (1925–2019), Hindi novelist, essayist
Atima Srivastava (born 1961), short story writer, novelist, screenwriter, film director
Arundhathi Subramaniam, since c.2003: poet, journalist, biographer
Vidya Subramaniam (born 1957), prolific novelist, short story writer
Sugathakumari (1934–2020), Malayalam poet, activist
Kamala Surayya (1934–2009), English-language poet, Malayalam short story writer, columnist, autobiographer
Sunita Jain (1940–2017), English and Hindi fictionist

T
Shweta Taneja (born 1980), novelist, comic writer, journalist
Sooni Taraporevala (born 1957), screenwriter, photographer
Romila Thapar (born 1930), historian, non-fiction writer
Susie Tharu (born 1943), non-fiction writer, educator, women's rights activist
Manjit Tiwana (born 1947), Punjabi poet, educator
Madhu Trehan, since mid 1970s, journalist, magazine editor
Ira Trivedi, since 2006, non-fiction writer, novelist, columnist
Ashwiny Iyer Tiwari (born 1979), author, filmmaker

U
Krishna Udayasankar, Singapore-based Indian author
O. V. Usha (born 1948), Malayalam poet, novelist, short story writer

V
Urvashi Vaid (born 1958), Indian-American LGBT activist, non-fiction writer
Vaidehi (born 1945), acclaimed Kannada short story writer, essayist, novelist, poet, children's writer
Aparna Vaidik (born 1975), historian
P. Valsala (born 1938), novelist, short story writer, social activist
Mahadevi Varma (1907–1987), Hindi poet, women's rights activist
Kapila Vatsyayan (1928–2020), art historian, non-fiction writer
Reetika Vazirani (1962–2003), Indian-American poet, educator
Kaajal Oza Vaidya (born 1966), screenwriter, novelist, journalist
Vijayalakshmi (born 1960), prolific Malayalam poet
Sharifa Vijaliwala, (born 1962), Indian writer and translator
Pinki Virani (born 1959), journalist, best selling novelist, non-fiction writer
Susan Visvanathan (born 1957), sociologist, non-fiction writer, novelist, essayist
Vrinda Singh, novelist writing on themes related to women

Y
Mallika Yunis, since 1980s, novelist

Z
Shama Zaidi (born 1938), art critic, screenwriter, filmmaker
Zahida Zaidi (1930–2011), poet, playwright, critic, educator

See also
List of women writers

References

-
Indian women writers, List of
Women writers, List of Indian
Writers